The 1987 State of the Union Address was given by the 40th president of the United States, Ronald Reagan, on January 27, 1987, at 9:00 p.m. EST, in the chamber of the United States House of Representatives to the 100th United States Congress. It was Reagan's sixth State of the Union Address and his seventh speech to a joint session of the United States Congress. Presiding over this joint session was the House speaker, Jim Wright, accompanied by George H. W. Bush, the vice president.

Progressing to the Afghanistan situation, he says: "The Soviet Union says it wants a peaceful settlement in Afghanistan, yet it continues a brutal war and props up a regime whose days are clearly numbered. We are ready to support a political solution that guarantees the rapid withdrawal of all Soviet troops and genuine self-determination for the Afghan people." He ended with, "But now at length I have the happiness to know that it is a rising and not a setting Sun." Well, you can bet it's rising because, my fellow citizens, America isn't finished. Her best days have just begun." 
The speech lasted 34 minutes and 39 seconds and contained 3847 words. The address was broadcast live on radio and television.
The Democratic Party response was delivered by Senator Robert Byrd (WV), and House Speaker Jim Wright (TX)

Richard Lyng, the Secretary of Agriculture, served as the designated survivor.

See also
Speeches and debates of Ronald Reagan

References

External links

 (full transcript), The American Presidency Project, UC Santa Barbara.
 1987 State of the Union Address (video) at C-SPAN
 Full video and audio, Miller Center of Public Affairs, University of Virginia.

State of the Union addresses
State union 1987
100th United States Congress
State of the Union Address
State of the Union Address
State of the Union Address
State of the Union Address
January 1987 events in the United States
Articles containing video clips